Jonathon Newby was the lead singer of the post-hardcore/progressive rock band Brazil from its inception in 2000 until August 2007. Newby and his brother Nic newly were two of the founding members. On earlier Brazil recordings, Newby played drums but eventually became the lead singer. Newby left the band in 2007, resulting in its break-up.

Lyrical influence
Newby takes inspiration from sources, such as literature, pop culture and film

Writing (non-musical)

Newby maintained a blog titled 500 Days of Night  chronicling every concert Brazil performed from 2000 to 2008.

Discography

Brazil

As JC Autobody

As City Water

As JXMAS

As Poorly Built Men

References

Year of birth missing (living people)
American rock singers
American male singers
Living people
Place of birth missing (living people)
People from Yorktown, Indiana